Burial places of presidents and vice presidents of the United States are located across 23 states and the District of Columbia. Since the office was established in 1789, 45 people have served as President of the United States. Of these, 39 have died. The state with the most presidential burial sites is Virginia with seven. Since its 1789 establishment, 49 people have served as Vice President of the United States. Of these, 43 have died. The state with the most vice-presidential burial sites is New York with 10. Fifteen persons have served as both president and as vice president. Of these, 14 have died, and each is listed in both tables. Altogether, 79 people have held either or both offices. Of these, 68 have died.

The first table below lists each deceased president's place of burial, along with the date of death, and the order of their presidency. The second table lists each deceased vice president's place of burial, along with the date of death, and the order of their vice presidency.

Presidential burial places

Notes

Vice presidential burial places

Notes

See also
 State funerals in the United States
 Funeral and burial of Abraham Lincoln
 State funeral of John F. Kennedy
 Death and state funeral of Richard Nixon
 Death and state funeral of Ronald Reagan
 Death and state funeral of Gerald Ford
 Death and state funeral of George H. W. Bush
 Attempted theft of George Washington's skull
 List of burial places of justices of the Supreme Court of the United States
 Presidential memorials in the United States

References

External links

Presidential obituaries
 Gravesites of U.S. Presidents

Burials in the United States
President United States
United States
United States
burial places

burial places